Joy Street is a 1929 American film directed by Raymond Cannon and starring Lois Moran, Nick Stuart and Rex Bell. It was made by the Fox Film Corporation using the studio's Movietone system to record music and sound effects.

Cast

References

Bibliography
 Pancho Kohner. Lupita Tovar The Sweetheart of Mexico. Xlibris Corporation, 2011.

External links

1929 films
1920s English-language films
Fox Film films
American black-and-white films
American drama films
1929 drama films
FIlms directed by Raymond Cannon (actor)
1920s American films